WDRE may refer to:

Radio stations 
 WDRE, a radio station (100.5 FM) currently licensed to Susquehanna, Pennsylvania, United States, playing an alternative rock format in the Binghamton, NY radio market.

Former radio stations 
 WPTY, a radio station (105.3 FM) licensed to Calverton-Roanoke, New York, United States, which used the WDRE call sign from 2004 to 2009
 WBON, a radio station (98.5 FM) licensed to Westhampton, New York, United States, which used the WDRE call sign from 1997 to 2004
 WPHI-FM, a radio station (103.9 FM) licensed to Jenkintown, Pennsylvania, United States, which used the WDRE call sign from 1996 to 1997
 WFME-FM, a radio station (92.7 FM) licensed to Garden City, New York, United States, which used the WDRE call sign from 1987 to 1996
 WRWB-FM, a radio station (99.3 FM) licensed to Ellenville, New York, United States, which used the WDRE call sign from 1981 to 1984

Other meanings 
 Western Desert Railway Extension, a railway in North Africa during the Second World War